Politics of Anguilla takes place in a framework of a parliamentary representative democratic dependency, whereby the Premier is the head of government, and of a  multi-party system. Anguilla, the most northerly of the Leeward Islands in the Lesser Antilles, is an internally self-governing overseas territory of the United Kingdom. The United Nations Committee on Decolonization includes Anguilla on the United Nations list of non-self-governing territories. The territory's constitution is Anguilla Constitutional Order 1 April 1982 (amended 1990 and 2019). Executive power is exercised by the Premier and the Executive Council. Legislative power is vested in both the Executive Council and the House of Assembly. 
The Judiciary is independent of the executive and the legislature. Military defence is the responsibility of the United Kingdom.

Executive branch

|Monarch
|Charles III 
|
|8 September 2022
|-
|Governor
|Dileeni Daniel-Selvaratnam
|
|18 January 2021
|-
|Premier
|Ellis Webster
|APM
|30 June 2020
|}
The Premier appointed by the governor from among the members of the House of Assembly. 
His cabinet, the Executive Council, is appointed by the governor from among the elected members of the House of Assembly.

Legislative branch
Anguilla elects on territorial level a legislature. The House of Assembly has 11 members, 7 members elected for a five-year term in single-seat constituencies, 2 ex officio members and 2 nominated members. The suffrage is from 18 years.
Anguilla has a multi-party system.

Political parties and elections

Judicial branch
The courts of Anguilla are:
 The Judicial Committee of the Privy Council in London; this is Anguilla's final appeal court.
 The Eastern Caribbean Supreme Court, including:
 the Court of Appeal, and
 the High Court, based in Anguilla.
 Anguilla's domestic courts (which enjoy appeals to the Court of Appeal), including:
 the Magistrates' Court, and
 the Juvenile Court.

The ECSC High Court Judge based in Anguilla is The Hon. Louise Blenman.

International relations
Anguilla is a member of CARICOM (associate), CDB, International Criminal Police Organization - Interpol (subbureau), OECS (associate) and ECLAC (associate).

External links
Official website of the government of Anguilla

References